Gustavo Nabor Ojeda Delgado (born 6 June 1947) is a Mexican politician from the Institutional Revolutionary Party. He has served as Deputy of the XLIX, LII, LV and LVIII Legislatures of the Mexican COngress representing Guerrero.

References

1947 births
Living people
Politicians from Guerrero
People from Iguala
Institutional Revolutionary Party politicians
21st-century Mexican politicians
Deputies of the LVIII Legislature of Mexico
Members of the Chamber of Deputies (Mexico) for Guerrero